Chapman Settlement is a community in the Canadian province of Nova Scotia, located in  Cumberland County.

References
Chapman Settlement on Destination Nova Scotia

Communities in Cumberland County, Nova Scotia
General Service Areas in Nova Scotia